Ludwig van Beethoven's Violin Sonata No. 1 in D major is a violin sonata from his Op. 12 set, along with his Violin Sonata No. 2 and Violin Sonata No. 3. It was written in 1798 and dedicated to Antonio Salieri. Being an early work written around the period when Beethoven studied with Haydn, the sonata is for the most part written in a classical style much like that of Mozart or Haydn.

It has three movements:

Allegro con brio
Tema con variazioni: Andante con moto
Rondo: Allegro

A typical performance lasts approximately 20 minutes.

Recordings
Yehudi Menuhin (violin), Wilhelm Kempff (piano)
Itzhak Perlman (violin), Vladimir Ashkenazy (piano)
Kristóf Baráti (violin), Kiára Würtz (piano)
Leonidas Kavakos (violin), Enrico Pace (piano)
Pamela Frank (violin), Claude Frank (piano)
David Oistrakh (violin), Lev Oborin (piano)
Jascha Heifetz (violin), Emmanuel Bay (piano)

Media

References

External links

Performance of Violin Sonata No. 1 by Corey Cerovsek (violin) and Paavali Jumppanen (piano) from the Isabella Stewart Gardner Museum in MP3 format
List of works by Beethoven with dates, keys and internal movement keys including for example that for opus 12/2.
 
 

1798 compositions
Violin Sonata 01
Compositions in D major
Music dedicated to students or teachers